Government Post Graduate College, Swabi is a postgraduate college in the Swabi District of Khyber Pakhtunkhwa in Pakistan. The college currently offers programs for inter level in Arts and Science groups plus it also offers courses in 4 years BS degrees and 2 years master's degree courses in Political Science & Economics. History

History 
It was established in 1962 as inter college in Gohati village of Swabi District. Initially the college campus was established in Government Primary School Swabi premises. In 1963, the college was moved to its current location for which the land of 110 canals was denoted by people of Maneri village. Initially, Pre-medical and Pre-Engineering classes were offered. The college was upgraded to degree level in 1964 and degree courses were offered in Chemistry, Botany, Zoology, Mathematics and Physics.

In 2003, the college was upgraded to post-graduate level due to people's demand with master's degree courses in two subjects Political Science and Economics

In 2012, the college introduced 4 years BS programs in Physics. Later, Chemistry, Botany, Economics and Political Science. The master's degree courses are shelved due to introduction of BS programs.

Faculties and departments 
The college currently have the following faculties and departments.

Social Sciences/Humanities
 Department of Archaeology
 Department of Pakistan Studies
 Department of English
 Department of Economics
 Department of Geography
 Department of Health & Physical Education
 Department of History
 Department of Islamiyat
 Department of Law
 Department of Urdu
 Department of Political Science
 Department of Library sciences
 Department of Pashto

Physical Sciences
 Department of Chemistry
 Department of Computer Science
 Department of Mathematics
 Department of Physics
 Department of Statistics
 Department of Electronics

Biological Sciences
 Department of Botany
 Department of Zoology

Programs 
The college currently offers the following programs.

BS Degrees (4 years) 
 BS Physics
 BS Chemistry
 BS Botany
 BS Economics
 BS Political Science
 BS English
 BS Urdu
 BS Mathematics
 BS Islamiyat
 BS Statistics
 BS Geography
 BS ZOOLOGY

Intermediate 
 FSc – Pre-Medical (2 years)
 FSc – Pre-Engineering (2 years)
 FSc – Computer Science (2 years)
 FA – General Science (2 years)
 FA – Humanities (2 years)

Notable alumni
 Taskeen Manerwal
 Asad Qaiser
 Mushtaq Ahmad Khan

See also 
 University of Swabi
 Women University Swabi

References 

Universities and colleges in Swabi District
Swabi District
Public universities and colleges in Khyber Pakhtunkhwa
1962 establishments in Pakistan
Educational institutions established in 1962